37th Street station, also known as 37th Street/Spruce Street/Woodland Avenue station, is a SEPTA subway–surface lines trolley station in Philadelphia. It is westernmost station of the subway–surface tunnel and carries Routes 11, 13, 34, and 36. The station is located on the campus of the University of Pennsylvania at the intersection of 37th and Spruce streets.

Trolleys serving this station go eastbound to Center City Philadelphia and westbound to the neighborhoods of Eastwick and Angora, as well as the Delaware County suburbs of Yeadon and Darby.

History 

The station was opened in November 1955 by the Philadelphia Transportation Company (PTC) as part of a larger project to move portions of the elevated Market Street Line and surface trolleys underground. The original project to bury the elevated tracks between 23rd to 46th streets was announced by the PTC's predecessor, the Philadelphia Rapid Transit Company (PRT), in the 1920s, but was delayed due to the Great Depression and World War II. The PTC's revised project also included a new tunnel for trolleys underneath the campus of the University of Pennsylvania, continuing from the original western portal at 23rd and Market streets to new portals at 36th and Ludlow streets and 40th Street and Baltimore Avenue.

The station's platforms are offset because during construction, the above intersection was a five-way junction between Spruce Street, Woodland Avenue, and South 37th Street. The latter two streets were later converted to pedestrian walkways.

In October 2006, Penn's class of 1956 donated a new covered headhouse for the eastbound platform entrance. The entrance is a replica of the Peter Witt trolley manufactured by J. G. Brill Company from 1923 to 1926 for Philadelphia's trolley system. The replica was built by the Gomaco Trolley Company.

Station layout 

The station has two low-level offset side platforms, each capable of platforming two trolleys at a time. Fares are collected manually on board the trolley cars.

References

External links 
 

 Images from NYCSubway.org
 Northwest entrance from Google Maps Street View

SEPTA Subway–Surface Trolley Line stations
Railway stations in Philadelphia
Railway stations in Pennsylvania at university and college campuses
Railway stations located underground in Pennsylvania